Magora Elmira Kennedy (born Magora Ernestine Molineaux; September 22, 1938) is an American minister and LGBT civil rights activist who participated in the Stonewall uprising. She is a former Black Panther and was involved in the civil rights and women’s rights movements. She is a self-proclaimed Black lesbian, crone goddess, and woman of God.

Early life 
Magora Kennedy was born on September 22, 1938 in Albany, New York and raised in Saratoga Springs, New York. Her father was White and Caribbean and her mother was Native American and Black. Kennedy knew that she was a lesbian from a young age. At age 14, she was outed and, in an attempt to “cure” her homosexuality, her mother offered her the choice of marrying a man, or be institutionalized at the Utica State Hospital. She ended up marrying a man 21 years her senior. The marriage was consummated, but later annulled because of her age. She later married a gay man, before divorcing him and publicly coming out as a lesbian. Kennedy's second husband was bisexual. On the LGBTQ&A podcast, she said, "He was in the army and he was a paratrooper. He was bisexual, so if he got discovered he was going to get kicked out of the army. I said, 'Not a problem. We can just get married.' They used to have the saying 'cover girl', 'cover boy'. And that was the way people that were gay...that's what they did."

Career 
Kennedy attended Boston University and worked as a comedian and singer (known for her platinum wig) before moving to New York to attend seminary. She returned to Boston, where in 1970, she served as minister of the Universal Life Church and secretary of the Boston Black Action Committee. She organized a children’s church choir called the “Little Wonders” at Way of the Cross Holy Church of God in Roxbury, but was asked to leave when her lesbianism was discovered.

Kennedy joined the Boston chapter of the Black Panther Party in 1968, spurred by the assassination of Martin Luther King Jr. On the LGBTQ&A podcast, she said, "They started throwing Black Panthers out, those that were gay...I told my commander, 'I'm leaving. I'm taking my sons and I'm going because I worked too hard and ain't nobody throwing me out of nothing.' So, we left. And they said, 'Well, we'll protect you.' I said, 'I don't need protection. I need to be open. And I am not going to subject myself to this.'"

Kennedy took part in the Stonewall uprising in New York in 1969. She was driving to Provincetown when she heard that LGBT people were fighting against a police raid at the Stonewall Inn, so she turned her car around and joined the uprising. She was also a member of Boston’s pride committee during its first pride march of June 1971. At the first stop of the march at drag bar Jacques Cabaret, Kennedy stated a list of demands:

Because we can’t go anywhere else, because as gay women we have been especially ghettoized here in Boston, and because the conditions at gay bars are by and large determined by the straight world, those in control know they can be as oppressive as they want. Jacques is terribly crowded and a fire hazard on weekends. Women entering the bar were subject to taunts by [straight] men, who not only [took] up badly needed room but also got their kicks leering and propositioning the women here. Sanitary conditions hardly exist at all. We are effectively ghettoized, since dancing between members of the same sex and other behavior, which the law deems to call lewd and lascivious, are illegal.

In 1971, she appeared on The David Susskind Show along with other LGBT activists, arguing against the American Psychiatric Association's designation of homosexuality as a mental disorder.

In 1975, she served on the Task Force on Racism of the Christian Social Action Commission of the Metropolitan Community Church.

Legacy 
Interest in Kennedy’s life has increased due to her participation in interviews and exhibits about the 50th anniversary of the Stonewall uprising and her participation in the documentary CURED. She is the former Chaplain of the Stonewall Veterans Association and is involved with the National Action Network.

Magora Kennedy describes her philosophy on life in her book “This Goddess Has Landed: Does She Have a Message For YOU!”: Mother Goddess/Father God loves you just the way you are.
 So learn to Love Yourself for real, as the star that you are.
 Love is the most powerful Force in the Universe.
 Sisterhood is Powerful!

Her forthcoming book is called Shades of Stonewall.

See also 

 Women in the Black Panthers
 Stonewall Riots
 Services & Advocacy for GLBT Elders

References 



1938 births
African-American activists
Activists from Boston
Activists from New York City
African-American Christian clergy
American chaplains
American Christian clergy
Clergy from Boston
Clergy from New York City
Lesbian feminists
LGBT African Americans
LGBT Christian clergy
LGBT people from New York (state)
American LGBT rights activists
Members of the Black Panther Party
People from Saratoga Springs, New York
Religious leaders from Albany, New York
Living people